Huh Joon-ho (born April 14, 1964) is a South Korean actor. His name was previously officially romanized as Hur Joon-ho and is sometimes romanized unofficially as Heo Joon-ho.

His father was Heo Jang-kang, a well-known Korean actor. Huh began his career in theater, then became active in film and television as a character actor, notably in the 2003 box office hit Silmido for which he won Best Supporting Actor at the Grand Bell Awards. He has also reprised the leading role in the stage musical Gambler several times.

Filmography

Film

Television series

Musical theatre

Awards and nominations

References

External links 

  at Story J Company 

 
 
 

 Fan cafe at Daum

20th-century South Korean male actors
21st-century South Korean male actors
1964 births
Living people
Seoul Institute of the Arts alumni
South Korean male film actors
South Korean male musical theatre actors
South Korean male television actors